Sophie de Bezancourt Loyré d'Arbouville, the Countess d'Arbouville (29 October 1810 – 22 March 1850) was a French writer.

Works
(translated by Lady Mary Fox) Mary Madeleine (1851)
Three Tales: Christine van Amberg, Resignation, and the Village Doctor (1853)
Poésies et Nouvelles (1855)

External links
 

Review of Sophie d'Arbouville's Poésies et Nouvelles, The Dublin Review, December 1856, pp. 411–41

1810 births
1850 deaths
French women poets
19th-century French women writers
French women short story writers
19th-century French short story writers
French women novelists
19th-century French novelists
19th-century French poets
French salon-holders